Mount Marston is a whaleback-shaped mountain,  high, standing at the north side of Kar Plateau,  north of the terminus of Mackay Glacier in Victoria Land, Antarctica. It was first mapped by the British Antarctic Expedition (1907–09) and was named for George E. Marston, the artist with the expedition.

References

Mountains of Victoria Land
Scott Coast